Argo was built in France in 1783, possibly under another name. She was taken in prize circa 1806 and sailed as a slave ship. She first appeared in the Register of Shipping in 1806.

Captain William Thompson sailed Argo from Liverpool on 10 April 1806, bound for Bonny.

In September 1806 Lloyd's List reported that Argo, of Liverpool, Thompson, master, had been lost on the coast of Africa. She had been lost on the Windward Coast; Her crew was saved.

In 1806, 33 British enslaving ships were lost. Twenty-three of these were lost on the coast of Africa. During the period 1793 to 1807, war, rather than maritime hazards or resistance by the captives, was the greatest cause of vessel losses among British slave vessels.

Citations

References
 

1783 ships
Ships built in France
Captured ships
Liverpool slave ships
Maritime incidents in 1806